Fetal incubator may refer to:
Neonatal incubator, a device used in a neonatal intensive-care unit
Artificial womb